Dunka mig gul och blå (roughly "slap me yellow and blue", with a reference to the colours of the flag of Sweden) is a song written by Frida Muranius and Johan Nordlund. Recorded by Frida Muranius, it became a mid-2007 hit. topping the Swedish singles chart. Attention was also brought when the Sveriges Radio local station SR Kronoberg banned the song for associations to domestic violence.

Chart positions

References

2007 singles
Number-one singles in Sweden
Swedish-language songs
2007 songs